The Babe Zaharias Invitational was a golf tournament on the LPGA Tour, played only in 1976. It was played at the Tanglewood Country Club in Chagrin Falls, Ohio. Judy Rankin won the event by one stroke over Jane Blalock.

See also
Babe Zaharias Open - an unrelated LPGA Tour event played in Texas from  1953 to 1967

References

External links
Tournament results at golfobserver.com

Former LPGA Tour events
Golf in Ohio
Sports competitions in Cleveland
1976 establishments in Ohio
1976 disestablishments in Ohio
History of women in Ohio